Greatest Hits is a compilation album by the Swedish pop group ABBA. It was originally released in Scandinavia on 17 November 1975 and in other parts of the world in 1976, notably the UK on 10 April, and on 18 September in the US and Canada. The 1976 version of the album included the band's most recent single "Fernando".

The album was released in response to similar ABBA compilation albums being issued at the time by record labels in other countries who had licensed ABBA's music for release in their own territories, and the threat of import sales of those compilations impacting upon ABBA's home market. This meant that the success of Greatest Hits was largely confined to Scandinavia and  the UK, although the size of the latter market and the scale of its success there has ensured that Greatest Hits is one of ABBA's best-selling albums worldwide. The album was the best-selling album of 1976 in the UK, and the country's second-best selling album of the decade.

Background
ABBA had won the Eurovision Song Contest in April 1974 with the song "Waterloo", which went on to be a major hit across Europe and in Australia and New Zealand. However, the immediate follow-up singles did not meet with the same success, and it wasn't until over a year later that "I Do, I Do, I Do, I Do, I Do", "SOS" and "Mamma Mia" became worldwide hits and reignited interest in the band. To capitalise on this resurgence of interest, several labels around the world released their own licensed compilations of ABBA's singles up to and including "Mamma Mia" – these included a similarly-titled Greatest Hits by France's Disques Vogue, and The Best of ABBA, released by West Germany's division of Polydor Records and by RCA Victor in Australia and New Zealand. To counteract the possibility of import sales from these records in Scandinavia, ABBA's record label Polar Music rush-released their own version of Greatest Hits.

Release
The tracks were taken from ABBA's first three studio albums, Ring Ring, Waterloo and ABBA, and with the exception of "Dance (While the Music Still Goes On)" had all been released as singles somewhere in the world. Despite the title of the compilation, only half of the tracks had actually charted as hit singles in major territories. "Waterloo", "SOS", "Mamma Mia" and (later) "Fernando" were top 10 hits in the UK and several other countries, though only the first of these was a top 10 hit in the US. Other hits in multiple territories included "I Do, I Do, I Do, I Do, I Do" (a top 10 hit in several countries, a number one in Australia, and a top 20 hit in the US, though barely cracking the top 40 in the UK), "Honey, Honey" (a top 20 hit in several countries and a top 30 hit in the US), "Hasta Mañana" (a top 10 hit in South Africa and New Zealand and a top 20 hit in Australia), and "So Long" (a top 20 hit in Germany and a top 10 hit in Sweden and Denmark).

"Ring Ring" reached number one in Belgium and Sweden, and went top ten in a few other markets. "Nina, Pretty Ballerina" was an A side in only a few territories, reaching number 8 in Austria, "Another Town, Another Train" was a B side in most territories, but reached number 18 in Rhodesia. "People Need Love" was a radio hit in several US regions, but didn't chart higher than #114 nationally (on the Cash Box chart). "Bang-a-boomerang" was an A side in France, where it was a minor hit.

A few more songs had been issued as singles somewhere in the world, with I've Been Waiting For You reaching #49 in Australia and Love Isn't Easy (But it Sure Is Hard Enough) charting at #21 in Denmark. 

The Swedish Radio hit parade was based on votes, not single sales. The group's first two singles, "People Need Love" and "He Is Your Brother", were hits on this Tio i Topp chart. In all, ABBA had nine songs in this chart, and the six that went as high as number three are included on the album.

Svensktoppen was a vote-based radio chart show for Swedish-language songs. ABBA had three number ones in this chart ("Ring Ring", "Waterloo", "Honey Honey") and a number 6 ("Åh, Vilka Tider"). Polar issued 'official' Swedish versions of "Bang-A-Boomerang" and "Dance (While the Music Still Goes On)" by Svenne & Lotta, both reached number 2 in this chart. Svenne & Lotta had hits with these songs in several markets. Other acts, including both Agnetha and Frida as solo performers, made Swedish-language versions of other ABBA songs; only "So Long"  had not been a hit on the Svensktoppen chart, though "So Long" had been a hit on the Danish equivalent Dansktoppen.

On the North American version of the album "Hasta Mañana" was omitted and the other tracks were reordered. In Australia, where several of the tracks had reached number one, the release of Greatest Hits was beaten to the market by the RCA Victor compilation The Best of ABBA, precluding a release there for years. Nevertheless, the official greatest hits package was an enormous success. Even Rolling Stone, often one of ABBA's harshest critics in the US, declared of the album, "Anyone who could listen to this record five times and not wind up humming half the songs is an android".

Polar's version of Greatest Hits reached number one in Sweden and in Norway, but lost out in sales over much of the rest of Europe and in Australia and New Zealand to the already released rival compilations. However, it had no competition in the UK and in North America, and the UK version of the album was released in April 1976. In the five-month period between the releases of the Scandinavian and UK versions of Greatest Hits, ABBA had achieved their second consecutive (and third overall) UK number-one single with "Fernando", and this song was added to the UK version of the album, as well as to a reissued version in Norway and Denmark. The release of Greatest Hits coincided with the start of ABBA's huge popularity in the UK during the latter half of the 1970s, becoming the first of eight consecutive number-one albums for the group. It spent eleven non-consecutive weeks at the top of the UK Albums Chart and went on to become the best-selling album of 1976 and the second best-selling album of the 1970s. As of July 2016 it is the 46th best-selling album of all time in the UK, with sales of over 2.6 million.

Greatest Hits was released in the US and in Canada in September 1976, but sales of the record did not peak until April 1977, when the song "Dancing Queen" reached number one in both countries. "Dancing Queen" was not included on Greatest Hits, but it was the lead single from the new studio album Arrival and it had generated interest in ABBA's back catalogue. Greatest Hits has been certified platinum in the US and quintuple platinum in Canada.

Artwork
The album was issued with two different gatefold covers, depending upon the territory. The painting on the original Scandinavian release was by artist Hans Arnold and had originally been awarded as a prize by Swedish magazine VeckoRevyn to celebrate ABBA being voted "Artists of the Year". The artwork was also used on the European-wide "30th Anniversary Edition" CD reissue, in a miniature replica gatefold album sleeve.

In the UK, North America and some other territories, the cover features a photograph taken by Bengt H. Malmqvist of the group sitting on a park bench on an autumn day. Benny and Frida are kissing, while Björn reads a paper and Agnetha looks straight into the camera. The image was used as the inner gatefold picture on the Scandinavian versions. It was also used on the US CD reissue by Atlantic Records in the 1980s, but without the track listing on the front.

Appearances in other media
The British/American version of the album sleeve appears in the popular 2015 science-fiction film The Martian, when the husband of the disco-loving ship commander Melissa Lewis reveals on a video link that he has found an original vinyl copy of the album. The track "Waterloo" also features prominently on the film's soundtrack.

Track listing

European version
All tracks written by Benny Andersson, Stig Anderson and Björn Ulvaeus, except where noted

 Note: the original UK release of Greatest Hits featured the addition of the recent number-one single "Fernando" as the album's final track – early pressings of the album do not include the song on the track listing on the sleeve and a sticker was placed on the cover to advertise its inclusion. The original 1975 Scandinavian releases do not feature "Fernando" – the album was reissued in 1976 in Norway and Denmark with the addition of "Fernando" as the first track on side one. The 2006 30th anniversary edition CD of Greatest Hits features the same 15-track running order as the 1976 Norway/Denmark reissue.

North American version
All tracks written by Benny Andersson, Stig Anderson and Björn Ulvaeus, except where noted

Personnel

Agnetha Fältskog - lead vocals , co-lead vocals , backing vocals
Anni-Frid Lyngstad - lead vocals , co-lead vocals , backing vocals
Björn Ulvaeus - lead vocals , co-lead vocals  Steel-string, acoustic guitar, backing vocals 
 Benny Andersson – synthesizer, keyboards, backing vocals
Janne Kling - flute

Charts

Weekly charts

Year-end charts

Decade-end charts

Certifications and sales

See also
 Music of Sweden

References

External links
 Official Abba Website

1975 greatest hits albums
ABBA compilation albums
Polar Music compilation albums
Albums produced by Björn Ulvaeus
Albums produced by Benny Andersson
Atlantic Records compilation albums
Epic Records compilation albums